Simon Lajeunesse (born January 22, 1981) is a Canadian former professional ice hockey goaltender. He was drafted in the second round (48th overall) of the 1999 NHL Entry Draft by the Ottawa Senators and played a single National Hockey League (NHL) game with the Senators during the 2001-02 season.

Playing career
Lajeunesse played his junior hockey in the Quebec Major Junior Hockey League. His play with the Moncton Wildcats attracted the attention of the Ottawa Senators, who selected him 48th overall in the 1999 NHL Entry Draft. He turned professional in 2001 with the Senators, playing for their minor league affiliate Grand Rapids Griffins of the American Hockey League (AHL) along with some games in the East Coast Hockey League (ECHL) with the Mobile Mysticks. Lajeunesse was called up to the Senators and he played 24 minutes of a March 7, 2002 game with the Senators, stopping all nine shots he faced. But due to a back injury, he couldn't continue the game. It would be the only time he would play in the NHL. The next season, he returned to the minor leagues and he did not return to the NHL. He played one further season in the Senators' system before being traded by Ottawa to the Florida Panthers for Joey Tetarenko on March 4, 2003. The rest of his career was spent playing for the San Antonio Rampage of the AHL and several teams in the ECHL. He finished his career with two seasons in the semi-pro Ligue Nord-Américaine de Hockey (LNAH) with Laval and St. George's before retiring in 2007 at the age of 26.

Career statistics

Regular season and playoffs

Awards
 2002 - Hap Holmes Memorial Award (lowest goals against average (GAA))

See also
List of players who played only one game in the NHL

External links

1981 births
Living people
Acadie–Bathurst Titan players
Augusta Lynx players
Binghamton Senators players
Canadian ice hockey goaltenders
Columbus Cottonmouths (ECHL) players
Dayton Bombers players
Fresno Falcons players
Grand Rapids Griffins players
Gwinnett Gladiators players
Ice hockey people from Quebec City
Mobile Mysticks players
Moncton Wildcats players
Ottawa Senators draft picks
Ottawa Senators players
Peoria Rivermen (ECHL) players
San Antonio Rampage players
San Diego Gulls (ECHL) players
Val-d'Or Foreurs players
Canadian expatriate ice hockey players in the United States